The 1909 FA Charity Shield was the second Charity Shield, a football match contested by the winners of the previous season's Football League and Southern League competitions. The match was played on 28 April 1909, between 1908–09 Football League winners Newcastle United and 1908–09 Southern League champions Northampton Town. The match was played at Stamford Bridge, London, and ended with a 2–0 win for Newcastle United. The goals were scored either side of half-time, by Jack Allan and Jock Rutherford.

The Newcastle United team of the 1900s were the club's most successful team to date, with the 1909 Football League title being their third in five years. 1909 was the club's first appearance in the Charity Shield out of six, but the only one that they have won. Northampton Town had risen to prominence under the management of Herbert Chapman, a pioneering manager who would later go on to win the Football League with Huddersfield Town and Arsenal. Northampton won their only Southern League title in 1909, and joined the Football League when the Southern League was merged into it as Third Division South in 1921  The 1909 Charity Shield remains their only appearance in a national cup final.

The match raised £226 for charity, with £45 going to both clubs and twelve London hospitals each received between £5 and £10. Including the clubs' allowances, all but £12 went to medical charities.

Match details

References

FA Community Shield
1908–09 in English association football leagues
Charity Shield 1910
Charity Shield 1910
Charity Shield
Charity Shield